A tomb ( tumbos) is a repository for the remains of the dead. It is generally any structurally enclosed interment space or burial chamber, of varying sizes. Placing a corpse into a tomb can be called immurement, although this word mainly means entombing people alive, and is a method of final disposition, as an alternative to cremation or burial.

Overview
The word is used in a broad sense to encompass a number of such types of places of interment or, occasionally, burial, including:
 Architectural shrines – in Christianity, an architectural shrine above a saint's first place of burial, as opposed to a similar shrine on which stands a reliquary or feretory into which the saint's remains have been transferred
 Burial vault – a stone or brick-lined underground space for multiple burials, originally vaulted, often privately owned for specific family groups; usually beneath a religious building such as a church
 Cemetery
 Churchyard
 Catacombs
 Chamber tomb
 Charnel house
 Church monument – within a church (or a tomb-style chest in a churchyard) may be a place of interment, but this is unusual; it may more commonly stand over the grave or burial vault rather than containing the actual body and therefore is not a tomb.
 Coemeterium
 Crypts – often, though not always, for interment; similar to burial vaults but usually for more general public interment
 Hypogeum tomb – stone-built underground structure for interment, such as the tombs of ancient Egypt
 Kokh (tomb) – a rectangular rock-cut sloping space, running inward, like tunnels into rock, sufficiently high and wide to permit the admission of a corpse
 Martyrium – Mausoleum for the remains of martyrs, such as San Pietro in Montorio
 Mausoleum (including ancient pyramid in some countries) – external free-standing structure, above ground, acting as both monument and place of interment, usually for individuals or a family group
 Megalithic tomb (including Chamber tomb) – prehistoric place of interment, often for large communities, constructed of large stones and originally covered with an earthen mound
 Necropolis
 Ohel, a structure built around the grave or graves of Hasidic Rebbes, prominent rabbis, Jewish community leaders, and biblical figures in Israel and the diaspora
 Pillar tomb – a monumental grave. Its central feature is a single, prominent pillar or column, often made of stone.
 Rock-cut tomb – a form widespread in the ancient world, in which the tomb is not built but carved out of the rock and can be a free-standing building but is more commonly a cave, which may be extensive and may or may not have an elaborate facade.
 Sarcophagus – a stone container for a body or coffin, often decorated and perhaps part of a monument; it may stand within a religious building or greater tomb or mausoleum.
 Sepulchre – a cavernous rock-cut space for interment, generally in the Jewish or Christian faiths (cf. Holy Sepulchre).
 Samadhi – in India a tomb for a deceased saint that often has a larger building over it as a shrine
 Other forms of archaeological "tombs", such as ship burials
 Tumulus – (plural: tumuli) A mound of earth and stones raised over a grave or graves. Tumuli are also known as barrows, burial mounds, Hügelgräber or kurgans', and can be found throughout much of the world. A cairn (a mound of stones built for various purposes), might also be originally a tumulus. A long barrow is a long tumulus, usually for numbers of burials.

As indicated, tombs are generally located in or under religious buildings, such as churches, or in cemeteries or churchyards. However, they may also be found in catacombs, on private land or, in the case of early or pre-historic tombs, in what is today open landscape.

The Daisen Kofun, the tomb of Emperor Nintoku (the 16th Emperor of Japan), is the largest in the world by area. However, the Pyramid of Khufu in Egypt is the largest by volume.

Composition

 Cadaver monument
 Columbarium
 Grave
 Headstone
 Lychgate
 Morgue
 Ossuary
 Reliquary

Styles
 Beehive tomb
 English church monuments

See also
 Death in Norse paganism
 List of burial places of presidents and vice presidents of the United States
 List of extant papal tombs
 List of mausolea
 List of non-extant papal tombs
 List of tombs and mausoleums
 Ziyarat – literally, "visitation"; the Islamic practice of making pilgrimage to graves and sites associated with religious figures:
 Dargah
 Türbe
 Zawiya
 Rawdah
 The Green Dome of the Mosque of the Prophet in Medina, which is built above the graves of the Islamic prophet Muhammad, Abu Bakr, and Umar.

Notable examples:
 Dartmoor kistvaens
 Mausoleum at Halicarnassus
 Great Pyramids
 Taj Mahal
 Tomb of Alexander the Great
 Tomb of Genghis Khan
 Mausoleum of the First Qin Emperor
 Catacombs of Paris
 Catacombs of Rome
 The Panthéon
 Church of the Holy Sepulchre, which contains the empty tomb of Jesus, where according to early Christian tradition he was buried and resurrected.
 Thracian Tomb of Kazanlak, Bulgaria
 Thracian Tomb of Sveshtari, Bulgaria
 Tomb of Seuthes III, Bulgaria
 Tomb of the Unknown Soldier
 United Kingdom: The Unknown Warrior
 France: Tomb of the Unknown Soldier beneath the Arc de Triomphe de l'Étoile
 United States: Tomb of the Unknown Soldier in Arlington National Cemetery
 Iraq: Monument to the Unknown Soldier
 Russia: Tomb of the Unknown Soldier in Alexander Garden, Moscow

References

Burial monuments and structures
Subterranea (geography)